Mariaan de Swardt (born 18 March 1971) is a former professional tennis player from South Africa, who was active from 1988 to 2001. She twice represented her native country at the Summer Olympics, in 1992 and 1996, and was a member of the South Africa Fed Cup team in 1992 and from 1994 to 1997. In 2006, de Swardt became a U.S. citizen.

De Swardt won two Grand Slam titles in mixed-doubles competition, the 1999 Australian Open and the 2000 French Open with partner David Adams.
She also won four women's doubles titles and reached as high as world No. 11 in the doubles WTA rankings. She has one WTA Tour singles title from 1998 and reached a career-high singles ranking of world No. 28 in 1996.

Since retiring from tennis, she has been a commentator for Eurosport and South African television, and has coached at professional, collegiate and recreational level with her base being at Atlanta, Georgia. She resides in Houston, Texas, and is a teaching professional at the River Oaks Country Club. In 2004, she set up a non-profit charity, the Pet Care Fund, to help animals.

Grand Slam tournament finals

Doubles: 1 (runner-up)

Mixed doubles: 2 (2 titles)

WTA career finals

Singles: 1 (1 title)

Doubles: 9 (4 titles, 5 runner-ups)

ITF Circuit finals

Singles: 11 (9–2)

Doubles: 10 (7–3)

Head-to-head records
 Anna Kournikova 1–0
 Martina Hingis 1–0
 Lindsay Davenport 2–0
 Venus Williams 1–0
 Steffi Graf 1–2
 Anke Huber 2–2
 Monica Seles 2–0
 Dominique Monami 1–2

References

External links
 
 
 

1971 births
American people of Afrikaner descent
Australian Open (tennis) champions
Delaware Smash
French Open champions
Grand Slam (tennis) champions in mixed doubles
Living people
Olympic tennis players of South Africa
People from Bluffton, South Carolina
South African emigrants to the United States
South African female tennis players
Tennis players at the 1992 Summer Olympics
Tennis players at the 1996 Summer Olympics
Tennis players from Johannesburg
White South African people